Barry Stevens (born 5 November 1929) is an Australian former cricketer. He played five first-class cricket matches for Victoria between 1957 and 1958.

See also
 List of Victoria first-class cricketers

References

External links
 

1929 births
Living people
Australian cricketers
Victoria cricketers
Cricketers from Melbourne